Shmaryahu Yosef Chaim Kanievsky (January 8, 1928 – March 18, 2022) was an Israeli Haredi rabbi and posek. He was a leading authority in Haredi Jewish society on legal and ethical practice. Known as Gadol HaDor ("the greatest of his generation") and the "Prince of Torah", much of his prominence came through Torah education and advice about Jewish law.

Though Kanievsky held no formal community-wide post, he was the de facto head of the Lithuanian branch of Haredi Judaism, revered as a consummate scholar of Jewish law and tradition, with unimpeachable rulings.

Early life 
Chaim Kanievsky was born in Pinsk, Poland (now in Belarus), to Yaakov Yisrael Kanievsky, known as the "Steipler Gaon", and Miriam Karelitz (Pesha Miriam: Pesha was added), sister of Avraham Yeshayahu Karelitz, known as the "Chazon Ish".

When Kanievsky was six years old, the family moved to Mandatory Palestine. After his immigration, he never left the country, even briefly. He worked hard learning Torah in his youth and was able to elucidate complicated rabbinic teachings as a young adult. During the 1947–1949 Palestine war, Rav Chaim, then a student at the Lomza Yeshiva, served in the Israel Defense Forces, guarding an outpost overlooking Jaffa.

Rabbinic career 

Kanievsky became a major authority on all matters of Jewish law, authoring several books about Jewish legal writings. He was notable even among Jewish scholars for annually reading the entire text of many sources of Jewish law, including not only the Babylonian Talmud but also the less commonly studied Jerusalem Talmud.

Kanievsky was the official rabbi and spiritual guide for the non-profit organization Belev Echad, which was founded in Israel in 2011 for the purpose of assisting sick and disabled children and adults. 

Starting around 2010, a controversy arose as to who would take control from the aging founder and director of Bnei Brak's Mayanei Hayeshua Medical Center, . Historically, the hospital had been managed by three distinct groups: A board of directors, an association of rabbis and public servants, and most influential of all, the "Halakhic Supervision Committee", a rabbinical committee consisting of Shmuel Wosner, Nissim Karelitz and Yitzchok Zilberstein, with Yisrael Rand, a confidant of Aharon Yehuda Leib Shteinman, serving as its secretary.  Rothschild wanted his son Shlomo to become director, while the rabbinical committee thought him to be a poor choice. In 2013, Kanievsky wrote a letter of recommendation for Shlomo, with Shteinman and Wosner signing on. One year later, Kanievsky was persuaded to join the board of directors.

From Shteinman's death in December 2017 until his own death, Kanievsky and Ponevezh Yeshiva head Gershon Edelstein were considered to be the leaders of the Israeli Haredi community.
He was regarded as the preeminent leader of Israel's non-hasidic ultra-Orthodox Jews.

Halakhic rulings 

In 2012, Kanievsky ruled that it is forbidden to possess or use a smartphone without individual permission from a halakhic authority, and that owners are not allowed to sell their phones, but should instead burn them. In 2015, he instructed United Hatzalah paramedics that in the event of a terrorist attack, they should not treat the terrorists before the victims, even if the terrorist is more seriously injured, and they may even leave the terrorist to die.

In 2016, Kanievsky declared that medicinal cannabis was kosher for Passover as long as the possession of the cannabis is not in violation of the law of the land.

In 2017, Kanievsky ruled that reporting instances of sexual child abuse to the police is consistent with halakha (Jewish law).

In 2011, he interpreted Arab Spring uprisings as evidence that the Messiah might be near. In 2015, following the 2014 Jerusalem synagogue attack, he repeatedly referred to the imminent arrival of the Messiah, and urged diaspora Jews to make aliyah (immigrate to Israel), reportedly resulting in the arrival of a substantial number of French Jews. In February 2020, shortly before the Israeli legislative elections, it was reported by one rabbi that Kanievsky had stated that the coming of the Messiah was possibly imminent.

Covid-19

At the beginning of the COVID-19 pandemic in 2020, Kanievsky told his followers that the best ways to defeat the virus were to avoid lashon hara (gossiping about one's peers), to strengthen humility, and to place the needs of others before their own. As a result of the discussion, he was visited, on March 15, by senior police officials who, with great respect, wanted to ask him of the importance of following the orders of medical professionals with regard to the outbreak.

On March 29, after the ultra-Orthodox community was hit hard by the virus, with Bnei Brak having a high percentage of coronavirus cases in Israel, relative to its population, Kanievsky ruled that one who does not follow the Israeli Health Ministry's guidelines on COVID-19 is in the position of a rodef, i. e., one who pursues another with intent to kill, a murderer. He also ruled that telephones may be answered on Shabbat to get COVID-19 test results, and that minyanim must not meet at all during the pandemic – a stricter requirement than the Health Ministry's rules, which at the time allowed congregations to meet outdoors as long as participants are at least two meters (6 feet) distant from each other.

On October 2, 2020, Kanievsky was diagnosed with COVID-19. On October 28, 2020, his physician said Kanievsky had recovered from the virus.

Kanievsky endorsed vaccination for all, and wished experts success in the national campaign of vaccination.

At one point in 2020, Rav Chaim advocated for Jewish academies to remain open. On the 11th of October, however, he rescinded.

Death 

Kanievsky died at his home in Bnei Brak on the Jewish holiday of Shushan Purim on March 18, 2022, at the age of 94. Around 750,000 mourners attended his funeral on March 20, 2022, making it one of the largest funerals in Israeli history, second only to Ovadia Yosef's funeral which had more than 850,000 in October 2013.

Personal life
Kanievsky was married to  Batsheva Kanievsky, daughter of Yosef Sholom Eliashiv. They had eight children. She died in 2011.

Published works 
 Derech Emunoh on agricultural laws of Eretz Yisroel. Vol. 1, Vol. 2, Vol. 3, Hashlama
 Derech Chochmoh on the laws of the Beis Hamikdash.
 Sha'arei Emunoh HebrewBooks.org Sefer Detail: שערי אמונה – חלק א – קניבסקי, שמריהו יוסף חיים, 1928–, Zeraim Vol. 1, Zeraim Vol. 2
 Shoneh Halachos a systematic presentation of the popular work Mishnah Berurah. Vol. 1, Vol. 2, Vol. 3
 Shekel Hakodesh on the laws of Kidush Hachodesh. HebrewBooks.org Sefer Detail: שקל הקדש – קניבסקי, שמריהו יוסף חיים
 Orchos Yosher HebrewBooks.org Sefer Detail: ארחות יושר – קניבסקי, שמריהו יוסף חיים בן ישראל יעקב
 Siach Hasadeh Vol. 1, Vol. 2, Vol.3
 Nachal Eisan on the laws of Eglah Arufah. HebrewBooks.org Sefer Detail: נחל איתן – קניבסקי, שמריהו יוסף חיים, 1978–
 Ta'ama D'kra HebrewBooks.org Sefer Detail: טעמא דקרא – קניבסקי,שמריהו יוסף חיים בן יעקב ישראל
 B'sha'ar Hamelech HebrewBooks.org Sefer Detail: בשער המלך – קניבסקי, שמריהו יוסף חיים, 1928–
 L'mechase Atik HebrewBooks.org Sefer Detail: למכסה עתיק – קניבסקי,שמריהו יוסף חיים בן יעקב ישראל
 Kiryas Melech HebrewBooks.org Sefer Detail: קרית מלך – קניבסקי, שמריהו יוסף חיים, 1928–
 Commentary on Maseches Tzitzis HebrewBooks.org Sefer Detail: ברייתא מסכת ציצית – קניבסקי, חיים
 Commentary on Maseches Avadim HebrewBooks.org Sefer Detail: ברייתא מסכת עבדים עם פירושים קנין הגוף וקנין פירות – קניבסקי,שמריהו יוסף חיים בן יעקב ישראל
 Commentary on Maseches Kusim HebrewBooks.org Sefer Detail: ברייתא מסכת כותים עם ביאור מצרף ומטהר – קניבסקי,שמריהו יוסף חיים בן יעקב ישראל
 Commentary on Maseches Geirim HebrewBooks.org Sefer Detail: ברייתא מסכת גרים עם פירושים אמת וצדק – קניבסקי,שמריהו יוסף חיים בן יעקב ישראל
 Commentary on Perek Shira HebrewBooks.org Sefer Detail: ברייתא פרק שירה עם ביאור פרק בשיר – קניבסקי,שמריהו יוסף חיים בן יעקב ישראל
 Commentary on Braisa D'Meleches HaMishkan and Braisa D'Maseches Middos HebrewBooks.org Sefer Detail: ברייתא דמלאכת המשכן עם פירוש טעם ודעת – ברייתא דמסכת מדות – קניבסקי,שמריהו יוסף חיים בן יעקב ישראל
 Commentary on Talmud Yerushalmi ("Be'ur")

References

External links 
 Rabbi Chaim Kanievsky. Wikinoah.org
 Shiurim by Rabbi Kanievsky on various topics. Kolhashiurim.com
 Divrei Torah by Rabbi Kanievsky on various topics. sites.google.com/site/onegshabboskodesh

1928 births
2022 deaths
Haredi rabbis in Israel
People from Bnei Brak
Exponents of Jewish law
Israeli people of Belarusian-Jewish descent
Israeli people of Polish-Jewish descent
Polish emigrants to Mandatory Palestine
Authors of books on Jewish law
Rabbis in Bnei Brak